The following is a list of teams and cyclists that took part in the 2021 Tour de France.

Teams
Twenty-three teams participated in the 2021 Tour de France. All nineteen UCI WorldTeams were entitled and obliged to enter the race, and they were joined by four second-tier UCI ProTeams. , the best performing UCI ProTeam in 2020, received an automatic invitation, while the other three teams were selected by Amaury Sport Organisation (ASO), the organisers of the Tour. The teams were announced on 4 February 2021.

UCI WorldTeams

 
 
 
 
 
 
 
 
 
 
 
 
 
 
 
 
 
 
 

UCI ProTeams

Cyclists

By starting number

By team

By nationality

References

2021 Tour de France
2021